ISIRI 9147 is the Iranian national standard for Persian keyboard layout, based on ISIRI 6219 and the Unicode Standard. It was published on 2007-04-08, under the title Information technology – Layout of Persian letters and symbols on computer keyboards, by Institute of Standards and Industrial Research of Iran (ISIRI).

References

ISIRI standards
Unicode